The AACTA Award for Best Original Screenplay is an award presented by the Australian Academy of Cinema and Television Arts (AACTA), for an Australian screenplay "written directly and originally for the screen". Prior to the establishment of the Academy in 2011, the award was presented by the Australian Film Institute (AFI) at the annual Australian Film Institute Awards (more commonly known as the AFI Awards). It was first handed out in 1978 when the award for Best Screenplay (which was first presented at the 1974-75 awards) was split into two categories: Best Original Screenplay and Best Adapted Screenplay. The award has since been presented intermittently from 1978-1979, 1983-1987, 1989, 1993-2006, and then from 2008-present.

Winners and nominees
In the following table, the years listed correspond to the year of film release; the ceremonies are usually held the same year. The films and screenwriters in bold and in yellow background have won are the winners. Those that are neither highlighted nor in bold are the nominees. When sorted chronologically, the table always lists the winning screenplay first and then the other nominees.

See also
AACTA Award for Best Adapted Screenplay
AACTA Award for Best Screenplay, Original or Adapted
AACTA Award for Best Screenplay in a Short Film
Australian Film Institute Award for Best Screenplay
AACTA Awards

References

External links
The Australian Academy of Cinema and Television Arts Official website

S
Screenwriting awards for film